WXKW was the call sign for two unrelated AM radio stations in upstate New York; originally on 850 kHz, with a second incarnation on 1600 kHz in the 1960s.

1948–1953: The original WXKW
WXKW took to the air on July 24, 1948. It transmitted from six inline 300-foot towers, on Beaver Dam Road in Selkirk, with 10,000 watts on 850 kHz. Studios occupied the entire fifth floor of the First Trust Company Building, 444 Broadway, Albany, a beneficial arrangement, as several of the station’s managers were also bank officers. Within a month of its debut, WXKW - with its much more powerful signal - managed to steal the ABC radio network from WOKO.

WXKW was plagued with technical and legal problems from day one. Its towers were supposed to beam its signal north and south, to protect WHDH Boston, on the same frequency, and KOA Denver, which reached 38 states at night. However, WXKW’s antenna array - the first of its kind in the country - proved an engineering nightmare, never operating to specs. Parts of its signal spilled out east and west. WHDH and KOA immediately filed interference complaints with the FCC. The Bureau mandated that WXKW lower its night power by 90 percent, to a mere 1,000 Watts, until hearings could be held.

Hearings were scheduled and rescheduled, dragging on almost indefinitely. The station operated on a conditional license for the better part of its lifetime. Although audible from Lake George to Kingston during the day, WXKW continued to limp along on low power at night. There was conjecture in the broadcasting community that WGY, owned by General Electric, and unhappy about having a powerful competitor just four channels up the dial,  was doing its best in Washington to make life miserable for WXKW.

At the time of its inception, WXKW (which began as WRWR) had also filed a TV application, just when the FCC instituted a freeze on licenses. When the freeze was lifted in 1952, there was a scramble among the area broadcasters for the two precious new UHF channels. A year later, in a complicated deal to end the rivalry for channel 23, Champlain Valley Broadcasting Corporation (WXKW’s owners) withdrew WXKW from the field and sold its physical assets (transmitter sites in Selkirk and Pinnacle Mountain in the Helderbergs, plus transmitting equipment) for $300,000 to the other three applicants. Management insisted it did so to spare lengthy litigation that would impede the development of local TV, but more likely the buyout - which mandated the station cease operations - enabled a clean exit from a messy operation.

WXKW/850 went silent at midnight on July 31, 1953.

1961–1966: Return of WXKW
The WXKW calls were once again issued to an Albany radio station on January 9, 1961, this time for a 500-watt daytime only station operating at 1600 kHz in Watervliet, New York, 6 miles north of Albany. This station went through a number of format changes in its short history, to include easy listening, middle-of-the-road, R&B and soul music, old-time radio, ethnic, religious, and even country music. The studios were located in the Hendrick Hudson Hotel in downtown Troy, New York, while the transmitter tower was located off 19th Street in Watervliet. That station had a very difficult time becoming financially stable, and late in its history it's said that employee paychecks frequently bounced.

On March 5, 1966, during a period when the owner owed several months of back rent, the landlord cut off the electricity to the station's studio. Later that evening, a fire completely destroyed the facility. The disc jockeys attempted to keep the station on the air by playing records at the transmitter site.  It was eventually decided that the staff of WXKW would shut down the station. After one final show on the station, playing music commercial-free, with just breaks for station identification on the hour and half-hour, the program director went on the air one last time at 10:55 and said, "Due to circumstances beyond our control, WXKW will cease operations at this time." The final songs played on WXKW were Auld Lang Syne and the National Anthem, and the chief engineer smashed the main transmitter tube at 11:00 a.m. That ended the second and final chapter of WXKW radio in the Capital District.

References

XKW
Defunct radio stations in the United States
Radio stations established in 1948
1966 disestablishments in New York (state)
1948 establishments in New York (state)
Radio stations disestablished in 1953
Radio stations established in 1962
1953 disestablishments in New York (state)
1962 establishments in New York (state)
Radio stations disestablished in 1966
XKW
XKW (1961-66)